Marie Olive Lembe di Sita (born 29 July 1976) is the former First Lady of the Democratic Republic of the Congo. She was the long-term girlfriend of Congolese President Joseph Kabila whom she married on 17 June 2006, becoming her country's First Lady.

In 1998, a daughter was born to the couple, Sifa Kabila, named after Kabila's mother, and former first lady Sifa Mahanya.

Wedding 
On 1 June 2006, the head of the Maison Civile, Theo Mugalu, officially announced the wedding of Ms. Lembe di Sita to the President. 

Two different dates emerged, some reports stating 10 June 2007, and other stating 10 June 2006. The wedding eventually took place on 17 June 2006 at the Presidential residence, in La Gombe, Kinshasa.

As President Kabila is Protestant, and Ms. Lembe di Sita is Catholic, the wedding ceremony was somewhat ecumenical, with both Cardinal Etsou, and Mgr Pierre Marini Bodho - Bishop and President of the Church of Christ in Congo, the umbrella church for most Protestant denominations in Congo - officiating. Cardinal Etsou had preeminence however.

References 

1976 births
Living people
First ladies of the Democratic Republic of the Congo
People from Maniema
Democratic Republic of the Congo Roman Catholics